Paul O'Loughlin was an Australian actor and director. He directed some of the first television plays in Australia. He joined the ABC in the 1930s. He directed numerous stage plays.

He was born and educated in Melbourne and worked in Brisbane and Adelaide.

O'Loughlin served in the RAAF in WWII and married Maiva Drummond in 1942. The couple had met in Melbourne in 1935 in the cast of Gregan McMahon's production of Sheppey.

Select Credits
The Twelve Pound Look (1956)
The Passionate Pianist (1957)
Three Cornered Moon (1957)
Sunday Costs Five Pesos (1957)
A Phoenix Too Frequent (1957)
The Importance of Being Earnest (1957)
Miss Mabel (1958)
Act of Violence (1959)

References

External links
Paul O'Loughlin at IMDb

Australian directors